J. Gregory Dash (1923–2010) was a physics professor, known for his research on superfluidity, adsorption of gases on smooth surfaces, surface melting, and films on solid surfaces.

Biography
Dash graduated with B.S. from City College of New York (CUNY) in 1944. During WW II he trained as a radar technician in the Pacific Fleet. He graduated from Columbia University with A.M in 1949 and Ph.D. in 1951. From 1951 to 1960 he was a staff member of Los Alamos National Laboratory. He was a Guggenheim Fellow for the academic year 1957–1958, which he spent at the University of Cambridge. In the physics department of University of Washington, Dash was an acting associate professor from 1960 to 1961, an associate professor from 1962 to 1963, and a full professor from 1963 to 2003, when he retired as professor emeritus. From 1961 to 1964 he was a consultant for the Boeing Company. He was a visiting professor at the Technion for the academic year 1974–1975 and an exchange professor at Aix-Marseille Université for the academic year 1977–1978. At the Advanced Study Institute, North Atlantic Treaty Organization (NATO), he was a director in 1985 and again in 1997. After retiring as professor emeritus in 2003, he, along with Ernest Mark Henley (1924–2017), continued to teach until 2009 at the University of Washington Transition School for gifted high school students.

At Los Alamos, Dash participated in pioneering measurements of the heat of mixing liquid 3He with liquid 4He.

In June 1945 Dash married Joan Geiger. Upon his death, he was survived by his widow, three children, and two grandchildren.

Selected publications

Articles

 1975

Books
 (pbk reprint of 1975 original edition)
 (originally published in 1980)
 (originally published in 1998)

References

1923 births
2010 deaths
20th-century American physicists
21st-century American physicists
City College of New York alumni
Columbia University alumni
University of Washington faculty
Los Alamos National Laboratory personnel